Cirripectes alboapicalis is a species of combtooth blenny found in coral reefs in the Pacific ocean.

References

alboapicalis
Fish described in 1899